Forsberg is a Swedish-language surname.

Geographical distribution
As of 2014, 62.5% of all known bearers of the surname Forsberg were residents of Sweden (frequency 1:590), 22.5% of the United States (1:60,128), 3.8% of Norway (1:5,096), 3.7% of Finland (1:5,547), 2.7% of Canada (1:50,339) and 2.1% of Denmark (1:10,062).

In Sweden, the frequency of the surname was higher than national average (1:590) in the following counties:
 1. Västernorrland (1:202)
 2. Västerbotten (1:226)
 3. Norrbotten (1:304)
 4. Gävleborg (1:329)
 5. Jämtland (1:376)
 6. Uppsala (1:392)
 7. Dalarna (1:422)
 8. Västmanland (1:459)
 9. Örebro (1:483)
 10. Värmland (1:523)

In Norway, the frequency of the surname was higher than national average (1:5,096) in the following regions:
 1. Svalbard and Jan Mayen (1:2,214)
 2. Eastern Norway (1:3,658)
 3. Northern Norway (1:5,053)

In Finland, the frequency of the surname was higher than national average (1:1:5,547) in the following regions:
 1. Ostrobothnia (1:2,317)
 2. Åland (1:2,484)
 3. Central Ostrobothnia (1:2,572)
 4. Uusimaa (1:3,095)
 5. Kainuu (1:4,779)
 6. Kymenlaakso (1:4,883)
 7. Päijänne Tavastia (1:5,415)

People
Amanda Forsberg (born 1846), Swedish ballerina
Anton Forsberg (born 1992), Swedish ice hockey player
Bengt Forsberg (born 1952), Swedish classical pianist
Billy Forsberg (born 1988), British speedway rider
Carl Johan Forsberg, Swedish painter
Chris Forsberg (born 1982), American racecar driver
Chuck Forsberg (1944–2015), American computer specialist
Emelie Forsberg (born 1986), Swedish trail runner and ski mountaineer
Emil Forsberg (born 1991), Swedish footballer
Eric Forsberg (born 1966), American screenwriter and director
Filip Forsberg (born 1994), Swedish ice hockey player
Franklin S. Forsberg (1905–2002), American publisher and U.S. ambassador to Sweden
Henrik Forsberg (born 1967), Swedish cross-country skier and biathlete
Josephine Forsberg (1921–2011), American writer and pioneer in improvisation at The Second City
Kevin Forsberg (born 1934), American systems engineer 
Lars Lennart Forsberg (1933–2012), Swedish film director
Magdalena Forsberg (born 1967), Swedish athlete
Michael Forsberg, American photographer
Peter Forsberg (born 1973), Swedish ice hockey player
Randall Forsberg (1943–2007), Gandhi Peace Award recipient
Rolf Forsberg (1925–2017), American actor, writer and filmmaker
Sara Forsberg (born 1994), Finnish singer, comedian, actress, and YouTube personality
Thomas Forsberg (1966–2004), Swedish musician, known as Quorthon

References

Swedish-language surnames